A modest number of newspapers have been produced in, or for, the Kimberley region of Western Australia. Few are still being published today. Some of the newspapers reflect the economic interests of the region, but not to the same extent that is seen in Pilbara newspapers. There is some cross-over between newspapers distributed in both the Kimberley and the Pilbara.

The Kimberley region has the second lowest population in Western Australia, accounting for approximately 6% of the state's population. However, from 2009 to 2013 the Kimberley experienced above average population growth at 2.7%. The low population numbers are reflected in the small number of Kimberley newspapers.

Titles

See also
 List of newspapers in Western Australia
 Gascoyne newspapers
 Goldfields-Esperance newspapers
 Great Southern newspapers
 Mid West newspapers
 South West newspapers
 Wheatbelt newspapers

References

External links 
 
 

Lists of newspapers published in Western Australia
Kimberley newspapers
Kimberley (Western Australia)